Proceratophrys cristiceps is a species of frog in the family Odontophrynidae. It is endemic to northeastern Brazil and occurs in the coastal region from the Bay of All Saints in central Bahia northward to the state of Rio Grande do Norte. Common name Muller's smooth horned frog has been proposed for it.

Description
Adult males measure  and adult females, based on only two specimens,  in snout–vent length. The head is wider than it is long. The snout is rounded from above but obtuse in lateral view. The tympanum is not externally visible. The canthal crests are poorly defined while the frontoparietal crest is not developed. The toes are partially webbed. The dorsum is scattered with several warts and small granules. The ventral surfaces, apart from the hands and feet, are covered by many small, circular, uniform warts and small granules. Dorsal coloration consists of marbling of various shades of brown on cream background, sometimes with a reddish tinge.

Habitat and conservation
Proceratophrys cristiceps occurs in the Atlantic Forest as well as its ecotone towards the Caatinga dry forest. Males call near temporary streams. The eggs are laid in the streams where the tadpoles later develop.

The probable threat to this presently common species is habitat loss caused by agriculture, livestock grazing, clear-cutting, human settlement, and fire. It is present in several protected areas.

References

cristiceps
Endemic fauna of Brazil
Amphibians of Brazil
Amphibians described in 1884
Taxa named by Fritz Müller (doctor)
Taxonomy articles created by Polbot